Cletus Seldin (born September 11, 1986) is an American professional boxer.

Early life
Seldin was born in East Yaphank, New York (part of Shirley, New York, on Long Island). He is Jewish. He was named after former New York Yankee third baseman Clete Boyer, who was a close friend of his grandparents. He grew up in Shirley.  His father is Harry Seldin. His grandfather Lee Seldin headed a motorcycle club, the Dragons, in Bedford Stuyvesant in Brooklyn, New York, during the 1950s.

At Longwood High School in Middle Island, New York, Seldin played cornerback and wide receiver on the Longwood Lions football team, which won the 2004 Long Island championship. He also wrestled and learned jiu jitsu. He later studied at Suffolk Community College.

Boxing career
Seldin's nickname is the Hebrew Hammer. He is trained and managed by Pete Brodsky, and promoted by Joe DeGuardia.

Seldin wears a Star of David on his trunks, as did former Jewish boxers Benny Leonard and Barney Ross. "Remember the Masada", a reference to the legendary mass suicide of Jewish rebels under siege by Romans in AD 74, is stitched on the back of his jacket. He describes his style as "come forward and fight." ESPN boxing writer Dan Rafeal described him as "a fun fighter."

Seldin began boxing as a professional in 2011, when he was 25 years old.

In April 2013, he had surgery for a torn right rotator cuff, labrum, and right hand. That was followed by nine months of recovery time.

Seldin made his national television debut in July 2014 on ESPN against Bayan "the Mongolian Mongoose" Jargal (17–5–3, 11 knockouts) at the Paramount Theatre in Huntington, Long Island, New York.  The fight ended as a "no-contest" in the third round, as the ringside physician called the fight when Seldin head butted Jargal and caused a badly swollen-shut right eye.

In December 2014, he again faced Jargal.  Seldin defeated him by a technical knockout in the ninth round, winning the World Boxing Council International Silver Light Welterweight title.

He won with a technical knockout against Johnny Garcia (19–2–1, 11 KOs) on ESPN's Friday Night Fights on February 27, 2015, headlining as the main event in a fight for Seldin's WBC title.  The referee stopped the fight in the fifth round.  Seldin brought his record to 16–0, with 13 knockouts, including knockouts in 12 of his last 13 fights.

On June 20, 2015 Seldin defended his WBC International Silver junior welterweight title and brought his record to 17-0 with 14 knockouts, with a 4th-round main event TKO of Ranee Ganoy, who was 38-13-2 with 32 knockouts, at The Paramount.

On April 6, 2017, Seldin tested positive for anabolic steroid use for a second time showing an increased level of testosterone and anabolic steroid Stanozolol also known as Winstrol , which forced his June 15 fight to be canceled. His testosterone to epitestosterone ratio (T/E) was 21.02 to 1, which far exceeded the allowable threshold of 4 to 1 under World Anti-Doping Agency standards. The WBC ruled that Seldin was suspended from participating in any WBC-sanctioned bouts for six months, or until Aug. 1, 2017, and that VADA would design a specific random testing protocol for Seldin at his own cost that would go on for one year.

On November 11, 2017, Seldin made his HBO Boxing debut fighting and winning in a third-round TKO against Roberto Ortiz, resulting in Ortiz's second-ever loss.  Seldin's record improved to 21-0 with 17 knockouts.

He is the reigning Super Lightweight Champion of the North American Boxing Association; in 2020 he broke his own record by winning 25 of 26 fights, with 21 knockouts, when he fought Luis Florez.

On October 16, 2021, in the main event at TrillerVerz at Barclays Center in Brooklyn, NY, he knocked out Brazil's Willam Silva in the seventh round.

Personal life
Seldin resides on Long Island.

Professional boxing record

See also
List of select Jewish boxers

References

External links
 
 Cletus Seldin official site

1986 births
Living people
Sportspeople from Brooklyn
People from Shirley, New York
People from Brentwood, New York
Boxers from New York City
Light-welterweight boxers
Jewish American boxers
Jewish boxers
World light-welterweight boxing champions
American male boxers
21st-century American Jews